This article describes the process by which the territorial extent of Morocco came to be as it is now.

The country reached its maximum extent during the period of these dynasties: Almoravid, Almohad, Marinid and the Saadi dynasty, in addition to the greatest extent of the current dynasty, the Alaouite.

See also
French Protectorate in Morocco
Spanish protectorate in Morocco
Tangier International Zone
Ifni province
Cape Juby
Spanish Sahara

Footnotes

External links

Morocco
Geographic history of Morocco
Maps of the history of Morocco